The Magic Touch is a 1962 album by jazz pianist and arranger Tadd Dameron and His Orchestra, released on Riverside Records. It was also Dameron's final completed work before his passing three years later.

The Allmusic Review of the line-up says that "one has to be in awe of them, and that only Dameron was able to convene such a band of extraordinary jazz performers in their prime."

The album has since been reissued many times on Original Jazz Classics, most recently in 2008.

Reception
In his Down Beat magazine review critic John S. Wilson awarded the album three stars and wrote: "Although Dameron's arrangements are, for the most part, designed as settings for soloists, neither the soloists nor the arrangements generate much interest."

Track listing 
All songs composed by Dameron except where noted.
 "On a Misty Night" 
 "Fontainebleau" 
 "Just Plain Talkin'" 
 "If You Could See Me Now" (Dameron, Sigman)
 "Our Delight"
 "Dial B for Beauty" 
 "Look, Stop and Listen "
 "Bevan's Birthday"
 "You're a Joy"
 "Swift as the Wind"

Personnel 
 Tadd Dameron - Piano, Arranger, Conductor
 Clark Terry - Trumpet
 Ernie Royal - Trumpet
 Charlie Shavers - Trumpet
 Joe Wilder - Trumpet
 Jimmy Cleveland - Trombone
 Britt Woodman - Trombone
 Julius Watkins - French Horn
 Jerry Dodgion - Alto Sax, Flute
 Leo Wright - Alto Sax, Flute
 Jerome Richardson - Tenor Sax, Flute
 Johnny Griffin - Tenor Sax
 Tate Houston - Baritone Sax
 Bill Evans - Piano
 Ron Carter - Bass
 George Duvivier - Bass
 Philly Joe Jones - Drums
 Barbara Winfield - Vocals (tracks 4, 9)

Production 
 Ken Deardoff - Design
 Phil DeLancie - Digital Remastering
 Ray Fowler - Engineer
 Joe Goldberg - Liner Notes
 Orrin Keepnews - Producer
 Steve Schapiro - Photography

References 

Tadd Dameron albums
1962 albums
Riverside Records albums
Albums produced by Orrin Keepnews
Original Jazz Classics albums
Albums arranged by Tadd Dameron
Albums conducted by Tadd Dameron